This is a list of law enforcement agencies in the state of Wisconsin.

According to the US Bureau of Justice Statistics' 2008 Census of State and Local Law Enforcement Agencies, the state had 529 law enforcement agencies employing 13,730 sworn police officers, about 186 for each 100,000 residents.

State agencies 

 Wisconsin Capitol Police
 Wisconsin Department of Corrections
 Wisconsin Department of Justice
 Wisconsin Department of Natural Resources
 Division of Forestry
 Foresters, Forester-Rangers
 Division of Enforcement and Science; Bureau of Law Enforcement
 Conservation Wardens, Deputy Conservation Wardens
 Wisconsin Department of Transportation
 Wisconsin State Patrol
 Troopers, Inspectors
 Wisconsin State Fair Park Police Department

County agencies 

 Adams County Sheriff's Office
 Ashland County Sheriff's Office
 Barron County Sheriff's Office
 Bayfield County Sheriff's Office
 Brown County Sheriff's Office
 Buffalo County Sheriff's Office
 Burnett County Sheriff's Office
 Calumet County Sheriff's Office
 Chippewa County Sheriff's Office
 Clark County Sheriff's Office
 Columbia County Sheriff's Office
 Crawford County Sheriff's Office
 Dane County Sheriff's Office
 Dodge County Sheriff's Office
 Door County Sheriff's Office
 Douglas County Sheriff's Office
 Dunn County Sheriff's Office
 Eau Claire County Sheriff's Office
 Florence County Sheriff's Office
 Fond du Lac County Sheriff's Office
 Forest County Sheriff's Office
 Grant County Sheriff's Office
 Green County Sheriff's Office
 Green Lake County Sheriff's Office
 Iowa County Sheriff's Office
 Iron County Sheriff's Office
 Jackson County Sheriff's Office
 Jefferson County Sheriff's Office
 Juneau County Sheriff's Office
 Kenosha County Sheriff's Office
 Kewaunee County Sheriff's Office
 La Crosse County Sheriff's Office
 Lafayette County Sheriff's Office
 Langlade County Sheriff's Office
 Lincoln County Sheriff's Office
 Manitowoc County Sheriff's Office

 Marathon County Sheriff's Office
 Marinette County Sheriff's Office
 Marquette County Sheriff's Office
 Menominee County Sheriff's Office
 Milwaukee County Sheriff's Office
 Monroe County Sheriff's Office
 Oconto County Sheriff's Office
 Oneida County Sheriff's Office
 Outagamie County Sheriff's Office
 Ozaukee County Sheriff's Office
 Pepin County Sheriff's Office
 Pierce County Sheriff's Office
 Polk County Sheriff's Office
 Portage County Sheriff's Office
 Price County Sheriff's Office
 Racine County Sheriff's Office
 Richland County Sheriff's Office
 Rock County Sheriff's Office
 Rusk County Sheriff's Office
 Saint Croix County Sheriff's Office
 Sauk County Sheriff's Office 
 Sawyer County Sheriff's Office
 Shawano County Sheriff's Office
 Sheboygan County Sheriff's Office
 Taylor County Sheriff's Office
 Trempealeau County Sheriff's Office
 Vernon County Sheriff's Office
 Vilas County Sheriff's Office
 Walworth County Sheriff's Office
 Washburn County Sheriff's Office
 Washington County Sheriff's Office
 Waukesha County Sheriff's Office
 Waupaca County Sheriff's Office
 Waushara County Sheriff's Office
 Winnebago County Sheriff's Office 
 Wood County Sheriff's Office

Municipal agencies 

 Adams Police Department
 Albany Police Department
 Algoma Police Department
 Alma Police Department
 Alma Center Police Department
 Almena Police Department
 Altoona Police Department
 Amery Police Department
 Antigo Police Department
 Appleton Police Department
 Arcadia Police Department
Arena Police Department
 Argyle Police Department
 Ashland Police Department
 Ashwaubenon Police Department
 Athens Police Department
 Augusta Police Department
 Avoca Police Department
 Baldwin Police Department
 Balsam Lake Police Department
 Bangor Police Department
 Baraboo Police Department
 Barneveld Police Department
 Barron Police Department
 Bayside Police Department
 Belleville Police Department
 Belmont Police Department
 Beloit Police Department
 Berlin Police Department
 Big Bend Police Department
 Birchwood Police Department
 Birnamwood Police Department
 Black Creek Police Department
 Black River Falls Police Department
 Blair Police Department
 Blanchardville Police Department
 Bloomer Police Department
 Bloomfield Police Department
 Blue Mounds Police Department
 Bonduel Police Department
 Boscobel Police Department
 Boulder Junction Police Department
 Boyceville Police Department
 Boyd Police Department
 Brandon Police Department
 Brillion Police Department
 Brodhead Police Department
 Brookfield Police Department
 Brooklyn Police Department
 Brown Deer Police Department
 Brownsville Police Department
 Burlington Police Department (City of Burlington)
 Burlington Police Department (Town of Burlington)
 Butler Police Department
 Cadott Police Department
 Caledonia Police Department
 Cambria Police Department
 Cambridge Police Department
 Cameron Police Department
 Camp Douglas Police Department
 Campbell Police Department
 Campbellsport Police Department
 Cascade Police Department
 Cashton Police Department
 Cassville Police Department
 Cedarburg Police Department
 Centuria Police Department
 Chaseburg Police Department
 Chetek Police Department
 Chilton Police Department
 Chippewa Falls Police Department
 Clayton Police Department
 Clear Lake Police Department
 Cleveland Police Department
 Clinton Police Department
 Clintonville Police Department
 Clyman Police Department
 Colby-Abbotsford Police Department
 Coleman Police Department
 Colfax Police Department
 Coloma Police Department
 Columbus Police Department
 Combined Locks Police Department
 Coon Valley Police Department
 Cornell Police Department
 Cottage Grove Police Department
 Crandon Police Department
 Crivitz Police Department
 Cross Plains Police Department
 Cuba City Police Department
 Cudahy Police Department
 Cumberland Police Department
 Dane Police Department
 Darlington Police Department
 De Pere Police Department
 Deforest Police Department
 Delafield Police Department
 Delavan Police Department (City of Delavan)
 Delavan Police Department (Town of Delavan)
 Denmark Police Department
 Dickeyville Police Department
 Dodgeville Police Department
 Dorchester Police Department
 Dousman Police Department
 Dresser Police Department
 Durand Police Department
 Eagle Police Department
 Eagle River Police Department
 East Troy Police Department
 Eau Claire Police Department
 Edgar Police Department
 Edgerton Police Department
 Eleva Police Department
 Elk Mound Police Department
 Elkhart Lake Police Department
 Elkhorn Police Department
 Ellsworth Police Department
 Elm Grove Police Department
 Elmwood Police Department
 Elroy Police Department
 Endeavor Police Department
 Ettrick Police Department
 Evansville Police Department
 Everest Metropolitan Police Department
 Fairchild Police Department
 Fall Creek Police Department
 Fall River Police Department
 Fennimore Police Department
 Ferryville Police Department
 Fitchburg Police Department
 Fond du Lac City Police Department
 Fontana Police Department
 Fort Atkinson Police Department
 Fountain City Police Department
 Fox Crossing Police Department
 Fox Point Police Department
 Fox Valley Metro Police Department
 Franklin Police Department
 Frederic Police Department
 Fredonia Police Department
 Freedom Police Department
 Fremont Police Department
 Galesville Police Department
 Genoa City Police Department
 Germantown Police Department
 Gillett Police Department 
 Gilman Police Department
 Glenbeulah Police Department
 Glendale Police Department
 Glenwood City Police Department
 Grafton Police Department
 Grand Chute Police Department
 Grantsburg Police Department
 Green Bay Police Department
 Green Lake Police Department
 Greendale Police Department 
 Greenfield Police Department
 Greenwood Police Department
 Hales Corners Police Department
 Hammond Police Department
 Hartford Police Department
 Hartland Police Department
 Hayward Police Department (City of Hayward)
 Hayward Police Department (Town of Hayward)
 Hazel Green Police Department
 Highland Police Department
 Hillsboro Police Department
 Holmen Police Department
 Horicon Police Department
 Hortonville Police Department
 Hudson Police Department
 Hurley Police Department
 Hustisford Police Department
 Independence Police Department
 Iola Police Department
 Iron Ridge Police Department
 Iron River Police Department
 Jackson Police Department
 Janesville Police Department 
 Jefferson Police Department
 Johnson Creek Police Department
 Juneau Police Department 
 Kaukauna Police Department
 Kendall Police Department
 Kenosha Police Department   
 Kewaskum Police Department
 Kewaunee Police Department
 Kiel Police Department
 Kohler Police Department
 Kronenwetter Police Department 
 La Crosse Police Department
 La Farge Police Department
 La Pointe Police Department
 La Valle Police Department
 Ladysmith Police Department
 Lake Delton Police Department
 Lake Geneva Police Department
 Lake Hallie Police Department
 Lake Mills Police Department
 Lake Nebagamon Police Department
 Lancaster Police Department
 Lannon Police Department
 Laona Police Department
 Lena Police Department
 Linden Police Department
 Livingston Police Department
 Lodi Police Department
 Lomira Police Department
 Lone Rock Police Department
 Lowell Police Department
 Loyal Police Department
 Luck Police Department
 Luxemburg Police Department
 Lyndon Station Police Department
 Madison Police Department
 Manawa Police Department
 Manitowish Waters Police Department

 Manitowoc Police Department
 Marathon City Police Department
 Marinette Police Department
 Markesan Police Department
 Marshall Police Department
 Marshfield Police Department
 Mattoon Police Department
 Mauston Police Department
 Mayville Police Department
 McFarland Police Department
 Medford Police Department
 Mellen Police Department
 Melrose Police Department
 Menasha Police Department
 Menomonee Falls Police Department
 Menomonie Police Department
 Mequon Police Department
 Merrill Police Department
 Merrillan Police Department
 Middleton Police Department
 Milltown Police Department
 Milton Police Department
 Milwaukee Police Department
 Mineral Point Police Department
 Minocqua Police Department
 Minong Police Department
 Mishicot Police Department
 Mondovi Police Department
 Monona Police Department
 Monroe Police Department
 Monticello Police Department
 Mosinee Police Department
 Mount Horeb Police Department 
 Mount Pleasant Police Department *
 Mukwonago Police Department (Town of Mukwonago)
 Mukwonago Police Department (Village of Mukwonago)
 Muscoda Police Department
 Muskego Police Department
 Nashotah Police Department
 Necedah Police Department
 Neenah Police Department
 Neillsville Police Department
 Nekoosa Police Department
 Neosho Rubicon Ashippun Police Department
 Neshkoro Police Department
 New Berlin Police Department
 New Glarus Police Department
 New Holstein Police Department
 New Lisbon Police Department
 New London Police Department
 New Richmond Police Department
 Newburg Police Department
 Niagara Police Department
 North Prairie Police Department
 Norwalk-Wilton Police Department
 Norway Police Department
 Oak Creek Police Department
 Oakfield Police Department
 Oconomowoc Lake Police Department
 Oconto Police Department
 Oconto Falls Police Department
 Omro POlice Department
 Onalaska Police Department 
 Oneida Police Department
 Ontario Police Department
 Oregon Police Department
 Orfordville Police Department
 Osceola Police Department
 Oshkosh Police Department
 Osseo Police Department
 Owen Police Department
 Oxford Police Department
 Palmyra Police Department
 Park Falls Police Department
 Pepin Police Department
 Peshtigo Police Department 
 Pewaukee Police Department 
 Phillips Police Department
 Pittsville Police Department
 Plain Police Department
 Platteville Police Department 
 Pleasant Prairie Police Department
 Plover Police Department
 Plum City Police Department
 Plymouth Police Department
 Port Edwards Police Department
 Port Washington Police Department
 Portage Police Department
 Potosi Police Department
 Poynette Police Department
 Prairie du Chien Police Department
 Prescott Police Department
 Princeton Police Department
 Pulaski Police Department
 Racine Police Department
 Randolph Police Department
 Readstown Police Department
 Redgranite Police Department
 Reedsburg Police Department
 Reedsville Police Department
 Reeseville Police Department
 Rewey Police Department
 Rhinelander Police Department
 Rib Lake Police Department
 Rice Lake Police Department
 Richland Center Police Department
 Ridgeway Police Department
 Rio Police Department
 Ripon Police Department (City of Ripon)
 Ripon Police Department (Town of Ripon)
 River Falls Police Department
 Roberts Police Department
 Rome Police Department
 Rosendale Police Department
 Rothschild Police Department
 Sand Creek Police Department
 Sauk Prairie Police Department
 Saukville Police Department
 Seymour Police Department
 Sharon Police Department
 Shawano Police Department
 Sheboygan Police Department
 Sheboygan Falls Police Department
 Shelby Police Department
 Shell Lake Police Department
 Shiocton Police Department
 Shorewood Police Department
 Shorewood Hills Police Department
 Shullsburg Police Department
 Silver Lake Police Department
 Siren Police Department
 Slinger Police Department
 Soldiers Grove Police Department
 Solon Springs Police Department
 Somerset Police Department
 South Milwaukee Police Department
 South Wayne Police Department
 Sparta Police Department
 Spencer Police Department
 Spooner Police Department
 Spring Green Police Department
 Spring Valley Police Department
 St. Croix Falls Police Department
 St. Francis Police Department
 St. Nazianz Police Department
 Stanley Police Department
 Star Prairie Police Department
 Stevens Point Police Department
 Stoddard Police Department
 Stoughton Police Department
 Stratford Police Department
 Strum Police Department
 Sturgeon Bay Police Department
 Sturtevant Police Department
 Suamico Police Department
 Summit Police Department
 Sun Prairie Police Department
 Superior Police Department
 Suring Police Department
 Taylor Police Department
 Theresa Police Department
 Thiensville Police Department
 Thorp Police Department
 Three Lakes Police Department
 Tigerton Police Department
 Tomah Police Department
 Tomahawk Police Department
 Town of Madison Police Department
 Townsend Police Department
 Trempealeau Police Department
 Trenton Police Department
 Turtle Lake Police Department
 Twin Lakes Police Department
 Two Rivers Police Department
 Union Center Police Department
 Valders Police Department 
 Verona Police Department
 Vesper Police Department
 Viola Police Department
 Viroqua Police Department
 Wabeno Police Department
 Walworth Police Department
 Washburn Police Department
 Waterford Police Department (Town of Waterford)
 Waterford Police Department (Village of Waterford)
 Waterloo Police Department
 Watertown Police Department
 Waukesha Police Department 
 Waunakee Police Department 
 Waupaca Police Department
 Waupun Police Department
 Wausau Police Department
 Wautoma Police Department
 Wauwatosa Police Department
 Webb Lake Police Department
 Webster Police Department
 West Allis Police Department
 West Bend Police Department
 West Milwaukee Police Department
 West Salem Police Department
 Westby Police Department
 Westfield Police Department
 Weyauwega Police Department
 Wheeler Police Department
 Whitefish Bay Police Department
 Whitehall Police Department
 Whitewater Police Department
 Wild Rose Police Department
 Williams Bay Police Department
 Wind Point Police Department
 Winneconne Police Department
 Wisconsin Dells Police Department
 Wisconsin Rapids Police Department
 Wonewoc Police Department
 Woodruff Police Department
 Woodville Police Department
 Wyocena Police Department

College and university agencies 
 Marquette University Police Department
 University of Wisconsin - Eau Claire Police Department 
 University of Wisconsin - Green Bay Police Department 
 University of Wisconsin - La Crosse Police Department 
 University of Wisconsin - Madison Police Department
 University of Wisconsin - Milwaukee Police Department 
 University of Wisconsin - Oshkosh Police Department
 University of Wisconsin - Parkside Police Department
 University of Wisconsin - Platteville Police Department
 University of Wisconsin - River Falls Public Safety Department 
 University of Wisconsin - Stevens Point Protective Services 
 University of Wisconsin - Stout Police Department 
 University of Wisconsin - Superior Campus Safety Office 
 University of Wisconsin - Whitewater Police Services Department

Indian nations
 Lac Courte Oreilles Tribal Police Department 
 Mohican Nation Tribal Police Department

Other groups
 Lake Winnebago Metropolitan Enforcement Group ’’MEG’’
 Northcentral Drug Enforcement Group ‘’NORDEG’’

References

Wisconsin
Law enforcement agencies
Law enforcement agencies of Wisconsin